Empty Spain (EV) is a political party in Spain. EV, whose name derives from the coined term to refer to Spain's rural and largely unpopulated interior provinces was formed as a political platform by a large number of citizen collectives and associations, in order to contest the next Spanish general election. In this, they were inspired by the success of the Teruel Existe candidacy (A part of the Empty Spain party, Spanish for "Teruel Exists") in the November 2019 general election.

It was registered as a political party on 30 September 2021. By November 2021, it was confirmed that over 160 collectives and associations from about 30 Spanish provinces committed themselves to finalizing the electoral platform before January 2022. On 30 November, national deputy and member of Teruel Existe, Tomás Guitarte, confirmed their intention to contest the next national elections as a single candidacy. 

The first election contested by the platform was 2022 Castilian-Leonese regional elections. It ran lists in five of the nine province of Castile and León. In the Province of Soria, member party Soria ¡Ya! was the most voted for party with 42.6%, taking three of the five seats for the province.

Member parties 
The following parties constituted on 27 November 2022 the federation of parties of the Empty Spain. On 15 January 2023 SOS West joined the federation representing Asturias.

Electoral performance

Cortes Generales

Regional parliaments

Notes

References

2021 establishments in Spain
Political parties established in 2021
Regionalist parties in Spain